Xpujil is a town in the Mexican state of Campeche. It serves as the municipal seat for the surrounding municipality of Calakmul. As of 2010, Xpujil had a population of 3,984.

Xpujil is located in the south-east of the state, close to the border with Quintana Roo to the east and Peten, Guatemala, to the south. With Escárcega, Campeche  to the west and Chetumal, Quintana Roo  to the east it is a useful midway point on Federal Highway 186. Close to the town are the Maya ruins of Xpuhil and Becan, Chicanná, Balamcan, Hormiguero. Further to the south-west is the major Maya site of Calakmul, in the  Calakmul Biosphere Reserve.

Highway 186 was, as of February 2009, undergoing a major refurbishment to a multilane highway that will improve access to the zone.

In addition to providing services for the local community, Xpujil has a paved runway and serves as the gateway for tourists visiting those areas, with restaurants, transportation services, modest hotels, etc. Currently many tourists travel by road from Cancun to Palenque, and stop to visit the many Mayan sites in the region.

There are plans to increase room availability and other services for eco-tourism and other activities within the Calakmul Ecological reserve.

XEPUJ, a government-run indigenous community radio station that broadcasts in Spanish, Yucatec Maya and Ch'ol, is based in Xpujil.

References

External links

Populated places in Campeche
Municipality seats in Campeche